Leap or LEAP may refer to:

Computing and technology
 Leap (computer worm)
 LEAP (programming language)
 Leap Motion, a motion-sensing technology company
 Leap Wireless, a provider of wireless services
 Lightweight Extensible Authentication Protocol, for wireless computer networks
 Local-electrode atom probe, an atomic-resolution microscope
 LEAP, the Low Emissions Analysis Platform energy systems modeling framework

Education
 LEAP High School, a high school for English language students
 Leap (education and training), a project in Suffolk, England
 Louisiana Educational Assessment Program (LEAP), including the integrated Louisiana Educational Assessment Program (iLEAP)

Entertainment
 Leap (Drop Trio album), a 2004 album by Drop Trio
 Leap (James Bay album), a 2022 album by James Bay
 Leap (music), a melodic interval
 Ballerina (2016 film), a French/Canadian animated film also known as Leap!
 Leap (film), a 2020 Chinese biographical film, based on the China women's national volleyball team

Places
 Leap, County Cork, a village in Ireland
 Randolph's Leap, a country area in Moray, Scotland

Transportation and aerospace
 CFM International LEAP, a turbofan jet engine
 LEAP, ICAO code for Empuriabrava Airfield in Girona province in Spain
 LEAPTech (Leading Edge Asynchronous Propeller Technology), a NASA project to demonstrate distributed electric propulsion for future aircraft
 Lightweight Exo-Atmospheric Projectile, a lightweight miniaturized kinetic kill vehicle

Other uses
 Law Enforcement Action Partnership, crime and law employees who advocate policies in the name of public safety
 Law Enforcement Availability Pay, a type of premium pay for federal law enforcement officers
 Leap Manifesto, Canadian activist manifesto during 2015 campaign
 LEAPS (finance), long-term stock options
 Leap2020, a think tank analyzing from a European perspective

See also
 The Leap (disambiguation)
 Giant Leap (disambiguation)
 Great Leap (disambiguation)
 Leap of faith (disambiguation)
 Leapfrog (disambiguation)
 Leap second
 Leap year (disambiguation)
 LEEP (disambiguation)
 Quantum leap, an Atomic electron transition